Babayouré Aboubacar Sawadogo (born 10 August 1989) is a Burkinabé footballer who plays as a goalkeeper for RC Kadiogo and the Burkina Faso national team.

Career
Born in Bobo-Dioulasso, Sawadogo has played for RC Kadiogo, Al-Nojoom and AS Douanes. He signed for Al-Nojoom on 9 August 2018. He made his international debut for Burkina Faso in 2017.

References

1989 births
Living people
Burkinabé footballers
Association football goalkeepers
Burkina Faso international footballers
2021 Africa Cup of Nations players
Saudi First Division League players
Rail Club du Kadiogo players
Al-Nojoom FC players
AS Douanes (Burkina Faso) players
Burkinabé expatriate footballers
Burkinabé expatriate sportspeople in Saudi Arabia
Expatriate footballers in Saudi Arabia
21st-century Burkinabé people
Burkina Faso A' international footballers
2018 African Nations Championship players
2020 African Nations Championship players